Christian Künzle (born 25 November 1954) is a Swiss former pair skater who competed with his twin sister, Karin Künzle. They are the 1973 Grand Prix International St. Gervais champions and seven-time Swiss national champions. The pair placed seventh at the 1976 Winter Olympics in Innsbruck, Austria.

Competitive highlights 
With Karin Künzle

External links 

Swiss male pair skaters
1954 births
Figure skaters at the 1976 Winter Olympics
Olympic figure skaters of Switzerland
Living people